Great Wall Studio or Changcheng Studio may refer to:

 Great Wall Film Company, Shanghai
 Great Wall Movie Enterprises, Hong Kong